The 2002 Rio de Janeiro motorcycle Grand Prix was the twelfth round of the 2002 MotoGP Championship. It took place on the weekend of 20–22 September 2002 at Autódromo Internacional Nelson Piquet.

MotoGP classification

250cc classification

125cc classification

Championship standings after the race (MotoGP)

Below are the standings for the top five riders and constructors after round twelve has concluded.

Riders' Championship standings

Constructors' Championship standings

 Note: Only the top five positions are included for both sets of standings.

References

Rio de Janeiro motorcycle Grand Prix
Rio de Janeiro
Rio de Janeiro Motorcycle Grand Prix